Seterstøa is a village in Nes in Akershus, Norway. The village has a railway station, Seterstøa Station on Kongsvingerbanen. There is also a bridge over Glomma at Seterstøa, replacing the former ferry.

Villages in Akershus
Nes, Akershus
Populated places on the Glomma River